Huddersfield Town's 1978-79 campaign was Town's penultimate season in their 5-year stint in the Football League's basement division. It also saw the arrival of Mick Buxton at the club, he would be Town's second longest manager in the club's history. After replacing Tom Johnston, Town gained a resurgence in their form and then finished in 9th place. It would be a precursor to Town's championship winning team the next season.

Squad at the start of the season

Review
Following on from the previous season's disappointments and the early season's poor form, Tom Johnston resigned and following a spell as caretaker, Mick Buxton became the new manager and helped Town recover their form mainly from the signing from Bury and the conversion of Keith Hanvey from midfield to defence to partner Dave Sutton in the centre.

Town would finish the season in 9th place with just 47 points, but the following season would see Town return to Division 3 in style.

Squad at the end of the season

Results

Division Four

FA Cup

Football League Cup

Appearances and goals

Huddersfield Town A.F.C. seasons
Huddersfield Town F.C.